Luciano Cornejo Barrera (born 26 October 1959) is a Mexican politician from the Party of the Democratic Revolution. From 2011 to 2012 he served as Deputy of the LXI Legislature of the Mexican Congress representing the State of Mexico, after having previously served in the Congress of Hidalgo.

References

1959 births
Living people
Politicians from the State of Mexico
Party of the Democratic Revolution politicians
21st-century Mexican politicians
Members of the Congress of Hidalgo
Deputies of the LXI Legislature of Mexico
Members of the Chamber of Deputies (Mexico) for the State of Mexico